The 1997–98 Wichita Thunder season was the sixth season of the CHL franchise in Wichita, Kansas.

The Thunder won the 1997–98 CHL Western Conference Champions, but were swept in the finals by the Columbus Cottonmouths.

Regular season

Division standings

y - clinched league title; x - clinched playoff spot; e - eliminated from playoff contention

Player statistics

Note: GP = Games played; G = Goals; A = Assists; Pts = Points; +/− = Plus/Minus; PIM = Penalty Minutes

Awards

See also
1997–98 CHL season

References

External links
1997–98 Wichita Thunder season at Hockey Database

Wichita Thunder seasons
Wich